Events in the year 2017 in American Samoa.

Incumbents
Governor: Lolo Matalasi Moliga
Lieutenant Governor: Lemanu Peleti Mauga 
Delegate: Amata Coleman Radewagen

Events

Deaths

22 February – Eni Faleomavaega, politician and attorney, Lieutenant Governor (1985–1989), delegate to the U.S. House of Representatives (1989–2015) (b. 1943).

References

 
2010s in American Samoa
Years of the 21st century in American Samoa
American Samoa
American Samoa